Humphreys County is a county located in the U.S. state of Mississippi. As of the 2020 census, the population was 7,785. Its county seat is Belzoni. The county is named for Benjamin G. Humphreys. Humphreys County is Mississippi's newest county, having been formed in 1918. Humphreys County is located in the Mississippi Delta region.

It was named 'Farm-Raised Catfish Capital of the World' in 1976 by then Governor Cliff Finch, since it produced more farm-raised catfish than any other U.S. county. Forty thousand acres (160 square kilometers) of the county are underwater and used to grow catfish. About 60% of U.S. farm-raised catfish is raised within a  radius of the county seat, Belzoni. The title "Catfish Capital" has also been claimed by Savannah, Tennessee, and Des Allemands, Louisiana.

Geography

Major highways
  U.S. Highway 49W
  Mississippi Highway 7
  Mississippi Highway 12
  Mississippi Highway 14
  Mississippi Highway 16

Adjacent counties
 Sunflower County (north)
 Leflore County (northeast)
 Holmes County (east)
 Yazoo County (south)
 Sharkey County (southwest)
 Washington County (west)

National protected area
 Theodore Roosevelt National Wildlife Refuge (part)
 Sky Lake Wildlife Management Area; the  area contains some of the oldest and largest bald cypress trees in the world.

Demographics

2020 census

As of the 2020 United States Census, there were 7,785 people, 3,186 households, and 2,078 families residing in the county.

2010 census
As of the 2010 United States Census, there were 9,375 people living in the county: 74.5% were Black or African American, 23.5% White, 0.2% Asian, 0.1% Native American, 0.9% of some other race and 0.7% of two or more races, and 2.2% were Hispanic or Latino (of any race).

2000 census
At the 2000 census, there were 11,206 people, 3,765 households and 2,695 families living in the county. The population density was 27 per square mile (10/km2). There were 4,138 housing units at an average density of 10 per square mile (4/km2). The racial makeup of the county was 27.17% White, 71.51% Black or African-American, 0.10% Native American, 0.27% Asian, 0.64% from other races, and 0.31% from two or more races.  1.50% of the population were Hispanic or Latino of any race.

There were 3,765 households, of which 36.60% had children under the age of 18 living with them, 38.30% were married couples living together, 27.70% had a female householder with no husband present, and 28.40% were non-families. Of all households, 24.90% were made up of individuals, and 10.90% had someone living alone who was 65 years of age or older. The average household size was 2.95 and the average family size was 3.54.

Age distribution was 32.70% under the age of 18, 10.70% from 18 to 24, 25.80% from 25 to 44, 18.80% from 45 to 64, and 12.00% who were 65 years of age or older. The median age was 30 years. For every 100 females there were 87.50 males. For every 100 females age 18 and over, there were 78.70 males.

The median household income was $20,566, and the median family income was $23,719. Males had a median income of $24,948 versus $19,201 for females. The per capita income for the county was $10,926. About 32.40% of families and 38.20% of the population were below the poverty line, including 50.30% of those under age 18 and 31.00% of those age 65 or over.

Humphreys County has the seventh-lowest per capita income in Mississippi and the 56th-lowest in the United States.

In April 2019, Propublica identified Humphreys County as the county most intensely audited by the IRS.

Politics
Like most counties in the Delta, Humphreys County is solidly Democratic. A Republican has not won the county since 1972. In 2001 the Humphreys County Sheriff's Department named J. D. Roseman the first black Chief Deputy. In 2008 he became the first black Sheriff of Humphreys County.

Media
 Radio stations (both located in Belzoni)
 WELZ 1460AM (Country)
 WBYP 107.1FM (Country)
 Newspapers
 The Belzoni Banner, distributed weekly
 The Enterprise-Tocsin, a newspaper based in Indianola in Sunflower County, is distributed in portions of northern Humphreys County.

Communities

City
 Belzoni (county seat)

Towns
 Isola
 Louise
 Silver City

Unincorporated communities
 Bellewood
 Deovolente
 Lodi
 Midnight

See also

 National Register of Historic Places listings in Humphreys County, Mississippi

References

 
Mississippi counties
1918 establishments in Mississippi
Populated places established in 1918
Black Belt (U.S. region)
Majority-minority counties in Mississippi